is a district of Nakano, Tokyo, Japan. 

As of October 2020, the population of this district is 21,573. The postal code for Nogata is 165-0027.

Geography
Nogata borders Maruyama in the north, Arai and Numabukuro to the east, Nakano and Kōenji to the south, and Yamatochō, Wakamiya, and Saginomiya to the west.

Education
Nakano City Board of Education (中野区教育委員会) operates public elementary and junior high schools.

Schools in Nogata:
 Kitahara Elementary School (中野区立北原小学校)

The zone for Kitahara Elementary includes 6-chome and parts of 3-5 chome. The zone for Heiwa-no-Mori Elementary School (平和の森小学校) includes parts of 1-2 and 3-chome. The zone for Keimei Elementary School (啓明小学校) includes parts of 1-2 and 5-chome. The zone of Midorino Elementary School (緑野小学校) includes a part of 4-chome.

Areas zoned to Midorino Junior High School (緑野中学校) include all of 3-4 and 6-chome, and parts of 2 and 5-chome. The zone of Nakano Junior High School (中野中学校) includes portions of 1 and 2-chome. The zone for Meiwa Junior High School (明和中学校) includes parts of 1-2 and 5-chome.

References

Neighborhoods of Tokyo
Nakano, Tokyo